Beer is a popular beverage in Bosnia and Herzegovina.    

Most of them were established in 19th century. The largest brewery is Sarajevska Pivara which was established in 1864. Other breweries include Pivara Tuzla (1884), Banjalučka Pivara (1873),  as Bihaćka Pivovara (1990), and Hercegovačka pivovara in Mostar (2007)

Breweries and brands
The main beer in Bosnia and Herzegovina is lager, drunk in over 95% of the cases. Popular brands are:
Preminger
Nektar
Tuzlanski pilsner
Sarajevsko pivo
Erster

Major Breweries
Sarajevo Brewery - Sarajevska pivara
Tuzla Brewery - Pivara Tuzla
Bihać Brewery - Bihaćka pivovara
Banja Luka Brewery - Banjalučka pivara
Herzegovina Brewery - Hercegovačka pivovara

References

External links
" https://web.archive.org/web/20171207213418/http://www.zmajpivo.ba/ 
Sarajevo Brewery - Sarajevska pivara
Tuzla Brewery - Pivara Tuzla
Bihac Brewery - Bihacka pivovara
Banjaluka brewery - Banjalucka pivara